Apollothemis can refer to a number of different men of classical antiquity:

 Apollothemis was a historian of ancient Greece, whom Plutarch made use of in his life of Lycurgus.
 Apollothemis, father of Diogenes of Apollonia
 Apollothemis of Smyrna, son of Pytheas, who is named in a subscription list at Smyrna.
 Apollothemis of Prokonnesos, Athenian exile who was likely the leader of the pro-Athenian faction in Prokonnesos. He may have died in exile after Prokonnesos was absorbed into Cyzicus in 362.

Notes

Ancient Greek historians